Jack Kenningham (born 19 November 1999) is an English rugby union player who plays for Harlequins in the Premiership Rugby.

Kenningham grew up in Twickenham, and attended Unicorn Primary School. At Reed's, he was a dual sportsman, playing in the first team for cricket as a opening bowler, as well as playing rugby. His father, David Kennigham, played rugby for Saracens and Richmond during his career.

He started in the Premiership final against Exeter on 26 June 2021 as Harlequins won the game 40-38 in the highest scoring Premiership final ever.

International career
He was called up to the senior England squad in September 2021 for a training camp.

References

External links
Harlequins Profile
ESPN Profile
Ultimate Rugby Profile

1999 births
Living people
English rugby union players
Rugby union players from Kingston upon Thames
Rugby union flankers
People educated at Reed's School